Sundance National Forest was established in the Bear Lodge Mountains of Wyoming by the U.S. Forest Service on July 1, 1908. It covered  from part of Black Hills National Forest and all of Bear Lodge National Forest.  On July 1, 1915  the entire forest was transferred to Black Hills National Forest and the name was discontinued.

References

External links
Forest History Society
Listing of the National Forests of the United States and Their Dates (from the Forest History Society website) Text from Davis, Richard C., ed. Encyclopedia of American Forest and Conservation History. New York: Macmillan Publishing Company for the Forest History Society, 1983. Vol. II, pp. 743-788.

Former National Forests of Wyoming